Küstriner Vorland (literally "Küstrin's foreland") is a municipality in the district Märkisch-Oderland, in Brandenburg, Germany at the border with Poland.

History
It was established on January 1, 1998 by the merger of Küstrin-Kietz with the villages of Gorgast and Manschnow. Küstriner Vorland is part of the Amt ("collective municipality") Golzow.

The settlement of Küstrin-Kietz formed the western part of Küstrin which is now Polish Kostrzyn nad Odrą, until it was cut off by the implementation of the Oder-Neisse line in 1945. The town's quarters west of the Oder River then belonged to East Germany and were renamed Kietz in 1954. In a 1991 vote the inhabitants chose to readopt the historic denotation.

The incorporated village of Gorgast, once a commandry of the Order of Saint John, features a historic fort finished in 1889 in addition to the Küstrin fortification system and a park laid out according to plans by Peter Joseph Lenné.

Politics
Seats in the municipal assembly (Gemeinderat) as of 2008 elections:
IG Küstriner Vorland (Free Voters): 9
The Left: 3
Pro Zukunft (Free Voters): 1
Evangelical parish: 1
Independent: 2

Transport

The border crossing at Küstrin-Kietz is the eastern terminus of the Bundesstraße 1 federal highway from Aachen via Berlin. It is continued by the Polish national road No. 22 to Gorzów Wielkopolski and Elbląg.

Küstrin-Kietz as well as Gorgast also have access to local trains running on the former Prussian Eastern Railway from Berlin-Lichtenberg to Küstrin (Kostrzyn nad Odrą).

Demography

References

External links

Localities in Märkisch-Oderland